Murray Hill is a New Jersey Transit station along the Gladstone Branch of the Morris and Essex Lines in the Murray Hill section of New Providence, in Union County, New Jersey, United States. It is located on Foley Place, between Floral Avenue and Southgate Road.

History

The Queen Anne-style station house was built in 1890 by the Delaware, Lackawanna, and Western Railroad. The identifying stylistic features of the station are the hipped roof with broadly-flared eaves which are supported by dramatic, oversized, decorative wooden brackets, the patterning of the horizontal exterior wood siding and vertical corner boards and multi-paned double-hung sash windows. The building lacks the lavish embellishment typical of Queen Anne buildings, however, and possesses a simplicity attributable to the Stick Style, an architectural trend that immediately pre-dated the rise in popularity of the Queen Anne fashion in the late nineteenth century. The building has been listed in the New Jersey Register of Historic Places and National Register of Historic Places since 1984 and is part of the Operating Passenger Railroad Stations Thematic Resource.

In 1982, a group of local volunteers stripped the many layers of paint off down to the wood and properly added coats of primer and the classic green color the station maintained for years. This effort was spearheaded by Arthur Braunschweiger, whose family owned a jewelry store in New Providence. On March 23, 2013, the floor boards of the waiting room were completely replaced.

Station layout
The station has one low-level side platform that is long enough for 5 cars. Murray Hill station features one of four remaining bypass tracks on the Gladstone branch to allow for opposing-direction trains to pass each other (most commonly observed hourly during weekend schedule operation). To allow for passengers to get on or off trains on the bypass track, there is a small wood platform near the middle of the main platform which crosses over the main track and is wide enough for one vestibule of the train.

In addition to the building with ticket office and waiting room, this station stop has a bench shelter next to the main track. Permitted parking is available, along with bicycle racks along the station house wall.

See also
List of New Jersey Transit stations
National Register of Historic Places listings in Union County, New Jersey

References

External links

NJ Transit Rail Operations stations
Railway stations on the National Register of Historic Places in New Jersey
Railway stations in the United States opened in 1872
Railway stations in Union County, New Jersey
Former Delaware, Lackawanna and Western Railroad stations
National Register of Historic Places in Union County, New Jersey
1872 establishments in New Jersey